"The Past Is Dead" is a song by American hardcore punk band Beartooth. The song was released on March 25, 2021, as the second single from their fourth studio album Below. It peaked at number 19 on the Billboard Mainstream Rock Songs chart in July 2021.

Background
The song was released on March 25, 2021, as the second single from their fourth studio album, Below, a week after the first single "Devastation". A music video was released the same day, featuring footage of the band performing the song among pyrotechnics and the band battling an surreal demon.

Frontman Caleb Shomo noted that "The Past Is Dead" was one of the earliest songs written for the Below album. The band worked on the song for over two years, eventually settling on the version that was included on the album, which ended up setting the tone for the rest of the album as well.

Themes and composition
The song is noted for maintaining the high energy commonly present in their music, but emphasizing emotive and melodic vocals rather than aggressive screaming. It contains metalcore guitar riffs and breakdowns with extensive guitar layering and overdubbing. The song's sound was described as more "anthemic", creating a juxtaposition between an uplifting sound and dark lyrical matter. Lyrically, the song is about the inability to move on from traumatic situations in life, inspired by Shomo's own mental strain he experienced over the course of 2020. The song's music video is meant to be a visual representation of the mental strain written about in the song.

Personnel
 Caleb Shomo – vocals, all instruments

Charts

References

2021 songs
2021 singles

Beartooth songs